Ali Benfadah ( – ) was an Algerian international footballer and manager who played as a forward.

Life and career
Born in 1935 in the small suburb tourism of Algiers, Zéralda, Ali quickly between the world of football, since signing in 1947 in the sports Zéralda Star, in which he will make all his classes as that hope and junior before joining the seniors in 1953 for the following two seasons. He left to join the ES Zéralda Gallia Algiers 1955. He will leave for work experience side Association Sportive Valencia in 1956, club he will leave soon to join the club Olympique Ales (where he will meet the one Ms. Bernon become his wife Micheline) and finally the Sporting d'Angers in 1959. The Order of the FLN football team Ali will be there from the beginning. He managed to join in Tunis this famous eleven of Independence and played two season. At independence of the Algeria in 1962, Benfedah returns to the Sporting d'Angers before taking the direction of Sporting Toulon Var the following season. He will return in 1964 in Algeria like player-coach of Hydra Athletic Club, and won the title of his division in the first season, and dolphin in its second season. He then fly to the Mouloudia Algiers in 1965, which was the sentence 2 division but Ali still succeed in winning the championship of the East group, which allows access to D1. He will end his playing career in 1967 when he goes cause Youth Sports Kabyle, with which he managed the feat of getting the D3 until the Algerian Ligue Professionnelle 1 in just two years. He returned to 1969 to Hydra AC as a coach, and next season he will start with the result USM El Harrach, before returning to the Mouloudia Algiers, where he will win the Algerian Cup 1971 and Maghreb Cup winners' Cup in the same year, he will lead thereafter the JS El Biar on CR Belouizdad, and will be in 1974 and 1978 assistant coach of the Algeria national football team he will return to the USM El Harrach at the end of his mission in 1978 and remained there until 1980 where it will join the USM Alger and which he will win his second Cup Algeria by 1981, it will access the club the following season D1 at the same time, it will go in 1982 club algerois to reach the Wydad Boufarik before returning to train youth categories. He died on 2 December 1993 in Mustapha Bacha hospital in Algiers.

Honours

Club
 JS Kabylie
 Ligue Nationale du Football Amateur (1): 1967-68
 Algerian Ligue Professionnelle 2 (1): 1968-69
 MC Alger
 Algerian Ligue Professionnelle 1 (1): 1971–72
 Algerian Cup (1): 1970–71
 Maghreb Cup Winners Cup (1): 1972
 USM Alger
 Algerian Cup (1): 1980–81
 Algerian Ligue Professionnelle 2 (1): 1980-81

References

1935 births
1993 deaths
Algerian footballers
Algerian football managers
People from Algiers Province
Association football forwards
ASOA Valence players
Olympique Alès players
Angers SCO players
SC Toulon players
MC Alger players
Algerian Ligue Professionnelle 1 players
Algerian Ligue 2 players
Ligue 1 players
FLN football team players
Algeria international footballers
Algerian expatriate footballers
Expatriate footballers in France
Algerian expatriate sportspeople in France
MC Alger managers
JS Kabylie managers
USM El Harrach managers
CR Belouizdad managers
USM Alger managers
WA Boufarik managers